Callindra principalis is a moth of the family Erebidae. It was described by Vincenz Kollar in 1844. It is found in the Pamir Mountains, Afghanistan, Pakistan, Kashmir, the Himalayas, Nepal and China (Zhejiang, Jiangxi, Sichuan, Yunan, Tibet).

Subspecies
Callindra principalis principalis (Pakistan, Kashmir, Himalayas, Nepal)
Callindra principalis flavicolor (Moore, 1879)  (Ladakh)
Callindra principalis fedtschenkoi (Grum-Grshimailo, 1902) (Tajikistan; China, Xinjiang)
Callindra principalis nuristanica (Kardakoff, 1937)
Callindra principalis regalis (Leech, 1889) (China: Zhejiang, Jiangxi, Sichuan, Shaanxi, Hubei, Hunan, Fujian)

References

Callimorphina
Moths of Asia
Fauna of the Himalayas
Fauna of Tibet
Lepidoptera of Nepal
Taxa named by Vincenz Kollar
Moths described in 1844